The 2001 AVC Cup Men's Club Tournament was the 3rd staging of the AVC Club Championships. The tournament was held in Shehong, China. Samsung Fire & Marine Insurance of Korea won the tournament after beating Suntory Sunbirds of Japan.

Preliminary round

Pool A

|}

|}

Pool B

|}

|}

Classification 5th–7th

Semifinals

|}

5th place

|}

Final round

Semifinals

|}

3rd place

|}

Final

|}

Final standing

Awards
MVP:  Shin Jin-sik (Samsung)
Best Scorer:  Zhao Zhiang (Sichuan)
Best Spiker:  Zhao Zhiang (Sichuan)
Best Blocker:  Ding Jun (Shanghai)
Best Server:  Behnam Mahmoudi (Sanam)
Best Libero:  Katsutoshi Tsumagari (Suntory)
Best Setter:  Choi Tae-woong (Samsung)
Best Digger:  Katsutoshi Tsumagari (Suntory)

References
Asian Volleyball Confederation
  Results

Asian
Volleyball
Volleyball